Azuayacana is a genus of moths belonging to family Tortricidae, with a single species found in Ecuador.

Species
Azuayacana cidnochroa Razowski, 1999

See also
List of Tortricidae genera

References

External links
tortricidae.com

Tortricidae genera
Monotypic moth genera
Taxa named by Józef Razowski
Moths of South America